Mozhga (Mojğa) is a rural locality (a village) in Shudeksky Selsoviet, Yanaulsky District, Bashkortostan, Russia. The population was 154 as of 2010. There are 2 streets.

Geography 
Mozhga is located 11 km southwest of Yanaul (the district's administrative centre) by road. Nokrat is the nearest rural locality.

References 

Rural localities in Yanaulsky District